The Cathedral of Santa Maria Assunta is the name of several churches consecrated to Santa Maria Assunta.
It may refer to:
 Acerenza Cathedral
 Acerra Cathedral
 Acqui Cathedral
 Ajaccio Cathedral
 Alife Cathedral
 Altamura Cathedral
 Andria Cathedral
 Aosta Cathedral
 Benevento Cathedral
 Chioggia Cathedral, the main place of worship in Chioggia, from 1627
 Cortona Cathedral
 Crema Cathedral
 Cremona Cathedral
 Foggia Cathedral
 Lucciana Cathedral
 Lucera Cathedral
 Naples Cathedral
 Novara Cathedral
 Oristano Cathedral
 Orvieto Cathedral
 Padua Cathedral
 Sarzana Cathedral
 Siena Cathedral
 Teramo Cathedral
 Terni Cathedral
 Torcello Cathedral, a basilica church on the island of Torcello, Venice, from 639
 Troia Cathedral
 Urbino Cathedral
 Venafro Cathedral